North Abaco is one of the districts of the Bahamas, on the Abaco Islands. It has a population of 9,578 according to the 2010 census.

Some of the more well-known settlements within this district include:

 Wood Cay
 Crown Haven
 Cedar Harbour
 Coopers Town
 Fire Road Village
 Black Wood Village
 New Plymouth
 Treasure Cay
 Murphy Town
 Dundas Town

Transportation
The area is served by Treasure Cay Airport.

References

Districts of the Bahamas
Abaco Islands